The Celebrate the Season Parade is one of the traditional parades held each year in Downtown Pittsburgh, Pennsylvania. It is held on the Saturday after Thanksgiving Day; that is, the last Saturday in November. It is one of the first events that rings in the holiday season and airs annually on WPXI, the local NBC-affiliated television station in Pittsburgh.

Parade history
The first parade was held in 1980 and aired on local Metromedia affiliate WPGH-TV for the first two seasons and was sponsored by local department store chain Kaufmann's. Kaufmann's merged with Macy's in 2006; from that parade through the 2013 event, Macy's assumed title sponsorship, thus making the parade a smaller sister to the much larger Macy's Thanksgiving Day Parade held two days earlier in New York City. WIIC, the local NBC station now known as WPXI, decided to air live coverage of the parade. Its original hosts were Mike Hambrick and Edye Tarbox. David Johnson and Peggy Finnegan took over the hosting duties in 1991. Bob Bruce subbed for David Johnson for the 2002 and 2004 parades. John Fedko, the station's sports director, debuted as a street reporter in 1997, and was joined by a rotating personality from the station every year. Darieth Chisolm joined Fedko for the 2004, 2006 and 2007 parades. Julie Bologna handled street interviews for the 2008 parade along with Fedko. Formally known as the Celebrate the Seasons Parade, from 2010 to 2013, the parade was also known as the My Macy's Holiday Parade'. In February 2014, Macy's Parade Group announced it would end its sponsorship of the parade, citing the need to focus on other projects. WPXI announced that they were saddened by Macy's decision and would work hard on finding a new sponsor before the 2014 parade. By the 2014 parade, Pittsburgh Public Schools joined as the presenting sponsor, with the parade's name changing again, to the WPXI Holiday Parade.

2020 saw no parade on grounds of COVID-19 pandemic. The 41st was deferred to 2021. NBC 11 aired highlights of past parades instead, plus virtual guests.

Future 
On September 8, 2021, WPXI announced they are ending their 30-year relationship with the parade. A statement posted on the official Twitter page of the parade saying 

"Channel 11 was proud to broadcast the Holiday parade for the past 30 years.

At this time we cannot continue to produce and broadcast the Parade.

We know it is a popular part of the holiday tradition for Pittsburghers and leave the door open to future broadcast opportunities if production partners arise. “

Thank you to all past participants and Parade watchers for the wonderful memories and moments over the years!"

Format
During the two-hour parade, about eighty different acts, local marching bands, floats, balloons, and celebrities take part every year. One of the floats that has appeared in the parade every year is the WPXI float, where some of the station's personalities gather together.

Celebrities
The parade has been popular with some celebrities that grew up in the Pittsburgh area or are nationally renowned. A sampling of some of the celebrities who have taken part:
 Ty Treadway, host of Merv Griffin's Crosswords
 Jimmy McGuire, Taylor Allderdice High School alumnus and Jeopardy! Clue Crew member
 Pat Sajak, host of Wheel of Fortune
 Christina Aguilera
 Pat Boone
 Billy Porter
 Marilyn McCoo and Billy Davis Jr. (former members of The 5th Dimension)
 Usher
 Bianca Ryan
 Willard Scott
 Ralph Kiner
 Peter Tork
 Povertyneck Hillbillies
 Chubby Checker
 Richard Karn
 Ming-Na
 Dan Cortese
 Blair Underwood
 Alex Trebek, host of Jeopardy!
 Bruno Sammartino
 Jim Kelly
 Dwayne Woodruff
 Louis Lipps
 Caroline Rhea
 Mr. McFeely with Purple Panda from Mister Rogers' Neighborhood
 Vanessa Campagna
 Mark Milovats
 The Jaggerz
 The Marcels
 Jimmy Beaumont & the Skyliners
 Chris Abbondanza
 Clifford the Big Red Dog
 Steely McBeam
 Iceburgh
 Pirate Parrot
 The Ultimate Warrior
 The Junkyard Dog
 Rowdy Roddy Piper
 George "The Animal" Steele
 "Macho Man" Randy Savage
 Dusty Rhodes
 The Drifters
 Jerome Bettis
 Joe Mascolo
 The Softwinds
 Rachel Rothenberg, 2009 Jeopardy! Teen Tournament champion
 Colin Raye
 Rick Derringer
 Mark Farner
 Mitch Ryder
 Franco Harris
 Jackie Evancho (performed "O Holy Night" in 2010)

Traditions
As is tradition, Santa Claus is always the last person to appear in the parade.

References

External links
PittsburghParade.com - Official parade website
WPXI.com - Official WPXI-TV website

Christmas and holiday season parades
Television shows set in Pittsburgh
Culture of Pittsburgh
American television specials
Local television programming in the United States
1980 American television series debuts
Thanksgiving parades
Macy's